Alexander Pierre "A. P." Tureaud Sr. (February 26, 1899 – January 22, 1972) was an African-American attorney who headed the legal team for the New Orleans chapter of the NAACP during the Civil Rights Movement. With the assistance of Thurgood Marshall and Robert Carter from the NAACP Legal Defense and Educational Fund, A. P. Tureaud filed the lawsuit that successfully ended the system of Jim Crow segregation in New Orleans. That case paved the way for integrating the first two elementary schools in the Deep South.

Career

Background 
Jim Crow laws arose directly from a Supreme Court ruling which validated a "states' rights" notion that blacks and whites could be equally well served using separate but equal public facilities. With Plessy v. Ferguson (163 U.S. 537 (1896)) the United States Supreme Court confirmed the right of state legislatures to enact discriminatory legislation. With this authority, civic organizations throughout the American South moved to restrict citizen access and limit citizens from exercising their civil rights based on the basis of their social and economic status, and on their personal history as descended from a former slave.

Louis Berry, the civil rights attorney from Alexandria and the first African American admitted to the Louisiana bar since Tureaud himself, had hoped to join Tureaud's law firm in the late 1940s, but Tureaud could not at the time afford to take on another attorney.

Cases 
In 1954, the United States Supreme Court overturned Plessy and ruled in Brown v. Board of Education that segregated schools were unconstitutional and must be desegregated "with all deliberate speed."  In the following years, A. P. Tureaud and the NAACP initiated the lawsuits which eventually forced the Orleans Parish School System to desegregate. He worked out of an office in the Peter Claver Building, which partly served as a headquarters for the local chapter of the NAACP.

Tureaud also filed suit in 1953 against the Louisiana State University Board of Supervisors seeking desegregation on behalf of his minor son, A. P. Tureaud Jr. As a result, his son became the first black student at LSU.

Death 
Tureaud died in New Orleans in 1972, roughly a month shy of what would have been his 73rd birthday.

Personal life 
Tureaud was Catholic, a member of St Augustine Church and the Knights of Peter Claver.

Honors 
The subject has a statue at the beginning of A.P. Tureaud Street in the 7th ward.

Notes

References 
 Rachel Lorraine Emanuel and Denise Barkis-Richter. Louisiana Public Broadcasting. "Journey for Justice: The A.P. Tureaud Story."
 Saint Augustine Church, Fauborg Treme, New Orleans. "Alexander Pierre Tureaud: Civil Rights Attorney (1899 – 1972)."
 New Orleans Public Library System. "Notable African Americans from Louisiana."
 Donald E. Devore and Joseph Logsdon. Crescent City Schools, July 1991. . Chapters VI and VII.
 
 A More Noble Cause: A. P. Tureaud and the Struggle for Civil Rights in Louisiana (A Personal Biography).

1899 births
1972 deaths
African-American Catholics
Lawyers from New Orleans
Louisiana Republicans
Louisiana Democrats
Howard University alumni
American civil rights lawyers
Activists from Louisiana
20th-century American lawyers
Knights of Peter Claver & Ladies Auxiliary
20th-century African-American people
Roman Catholic activists